La Raza is the sixth studio album by American heavy metal band Armored Saint, released on March 16, 2010 via Metal Blade Records. Armored Saint reformed the entire Symbol of Salvation lineup to record La Raza in 2009 after an eight-year hiatus.

Track listing

Personnel
Band members
John Bush – lead vocals
Phil Sandoval – lead guitar
Jeff Duncan – lead guitar
Joey Vera – bass, backing vocals
Gonzo Sandoval – drums

Additional musicians
Steve Zukowsky – theremin 
Eddie Rouse – congas 
Jon Saxon – percussion 

Production
Joey Vera – production, engineering, mixing, concept
Bryan Carlstrom – engineering, mixing 
John Nuss – assistant engineering 
Maor Appelbaum – mastering engineering 
Brian Ames – layout, sleeve design 
Gonzo Sandoval - concept 
Stephanie Cabral – concept, cover design photography

References

2010 albums
Metal Blade Records albums
Armored Saint albums